Osmondthorpe was a railway station between  and  on the Leeds to York Line (part of the Cross Country Route). It was opened as Osmondthorpe Halt by the London and North Eastern Railway in September 1930 to serve new estates being built in the area. The station was of timber construction and was built without goods facilities. After May 1937, the word Halt was dropped from the station name.

The station was closed in March 1960.

References

Disused railway stations in Leeds
Railway stations in Great Britain closed in 1960
Railway stations in Great Britain opened in 1930
Former London and North Eastern Railway stations